Kwame Gershion Quansah (born 24 November 1982) is a Ghanaian former professional footballer who played as a defensive midfielder.

Club career
Quansah was born in Tema, Ghana. He previously played for Asante Kotoko, Ajax, Germinal Beerschot and AIK.

He subsequently joined Heracles Almelo in 2004, where he spent the major part of his career and became the club's record holder for most appearances in the Eredivisie with 262. This feat was only surpassed in December 2020, when Tim Breukers reached matched the record. His form in the 2008–09 season earned him two caps for Ghana.

Quansah retired in 2016, after a short stint in China with Qingdao Red Lions.

International career
Quansah made his debut for the Ghana national football team on 15 October 2008 in a friendly against South Africa. He was called up to an African Cup of Nations qualifications game. He was part of Ghana national team preparation for World Cup 2006.

Honours
Heracles Almelo
 Eerste Divisie: 2004–05

References

External links
 Voetbal International profile 
 Official site

1982 births
Living people
People from Tema
Association football midfielders
Ghanaian footballers
Ghana international footballers
Asante Kotoko S.C. players
AFC Ajax players
Beerschot A.C. players
AIK Fotboll players
Heracles Almelo players
Belgian Pro League players
Allsvenskan players
Eredivisie players
Eerste Divisie players
Ghanaian expatriate footballers
Expatriate footballers in Belgium
Ghanaian expatriate sportspeople in Belgium
Expatriate footballers in Sweden
Ghanaian expatriate sportspeople in Sweden
Expatriate footballers in the Netherlands
Ghanaian expatriate sportspeople in the Netherlands
Expatriate footballers in China
Ghanaian expatriate sportspeople in China